Sakoumba is a village in the Bamingui-Bangoran prefecture in the northern Central African Republic.

Populated places in Bamingui-Bangoran
Bamingui